Londrina State University (UEL) is one of the public universities of the State of Paraná, Brazil.

External links 
Official Page of Londrina State University (in Portuguese)

Educational institutions established in 1970
1970 establishments in Brazil
Education in Londrina
Universities and colleges in Paraná
Paraná